Warren Roger King (born May 9, 1937) is a former judge of the Superior Court of the District of Columbia and the District of Columbia Court of Appeals.

Biography 
King was raised in Washington, D.C., and Maryland. He graduated from Rensselaer Polytechnic Institute in 1960 and served in the United States Navy. In 1969 he returned to D.C. and joined the U.S. Attorney's office, where he prosecuted cases at the trial and appellate levels. In 1975, he left the U.S. Attorney's office to teach at the Antioch School of Law. In 1981, he became a Superior Court judge, and in 1991 he was elevated to the appeals court. He took senior status in 1998 and retired from the bench in 2016.

References

Sources 
 

1937 births
Living people
Lawyers from Washington, D.C.
Judges of the District of Columbia Court of Appeals
Rensselaer Polytechnic Institute alumni
Washington College of Law alumni
Assistant United States Attorneys
Judges of the Superior Court of the District of Columbia
20th-century American judges